The 1977 Giro d'Italia was the 60th edition of the Giro d'Italia, one of cycling's Grand Tours. The Giro began with a prologue individual time trial in Bacoli on 20 May, and Stage 11 occurred on 31 May with a mountainous stage from Salsomaggiore Terme. The race finished in Milan on 12 June.

Stage 11
31 May 1977 — Salsomaggiore Terme to Santa Margherita Ligure,

Rest day
1 June 1977

Stage 12
2 June 1977 — Santa Margherita Ligure-San Giacomo di Roburent,

Stage 13
3 June 1977 — Mondovì to Varzi,

Stage 14
4 June 1977 — Voghera to Vicenza,

Stage 15
5 June 1977 — Vicenza to Trieste,

Stage 16a
6 June 1977 — Trieste to Gemona del Friuli,

Stage 16b
6 June 1977 — Gemona del Friuli to Conegliano,

Stage 17
7 June 1977 — Conegliano to Cortina d'Ampezzo,

Stage 18
8 June 1977 — Cortina d'Ampezzo to Pinzolo,

Stage 19
9 June 1977 — Pinzolo to San Pellegrino Terme,

Stage 20
10 June 1977 — San Pellegrino Terme to Varese,

Stage 21
11 June 1977 — Binago to Binago,  (ITT)

Stage 22
12 June 1977 — Milan to Milan,

References

1977 Giro d'Italia
Giro d'Italia stages